Coreplay was a video game developer located in Munich, Germany. The company was founded by Peter Ohlmann and Andreas Drude in 2007. Peter Ohlmann previously worked on The Settlers II, Knights and Merchants and SpellForce 2. Coreplay shut down in September 2013 due to issues with their publisher, bitComposer, while Chaos Chronicles was still in development.

With Ion Assault, Coreplay was the first German game development company that released a game on Xbox Live Arcade.

Their project Jagged Alliance: Back in Action was announced to be released in February 2012. The game is a remake of Jagged Alliance 2 by Sir-Tech with additional features of an average graphical 3D engine, "Plan & Go" system and about 60 mercenaries for hire. The company stated that all the original voice actors will take be present in Back in Action.

Games developed
Crazy Chicken Tales (2008, Wii)
Germany's Next Topmodel (2009, Wii, Windows)
Ion Assault (2009, Xbox 360)
Fit for Fun (2010, Wii)
Jagged Alliance: Back in Action (2012, Windows)
Chaos Chronicles (cancelled, Windows)

References

External links

Video game development companies
German companies established in 2007
Video game companies established in 2007
Video game companies disestablished in 2013
Defunct companies based in Munich
Defunct video game companies of Germany
2013 disestablishments in Germany